The 9.3×62mm (also known as 9.3×62mm Mauser) is a rimless, bottlenecked rifle cartridge designed in 1905 by German gunmaker Otto Bock. It is suitable for hunting medium to large game animals in Africa, Asia, Europe, and North America. At a typical velocity of 720 m/s (2362 ft/s), its 286 gr (18.5 g) standard load balances recoil and power for effective use at 250m (275 yds) to 300m (328 yds).

The 9.3×62mm was designed to fit into the Mauser 98 bolt-action rifle. European hunters and settlers in Africa often chose military rifles for their reliability and low cost, but colonial governments in Africa fearful of rebellions often banned military-caliber rifles and ammunition. The 9.3×62mm was never a military cartridge and so never had this problem. Like their military counterparts, Mauser rifles chambered in 9.3×62mm were relatively inexpensive and quite reliable. Because of these factors, 9.3x62mm quickly became popular, and usage of the cartridge became widespread.

The 9.3×74mmR is a rimmed cartridge that evolved from the 9.3×72mmR black powder cartridge. The energy levels of the 9.3×62mm and 9.3×74mmR cartridges are similar, but the cartridges are unrelated. The rimmed cartridge is slightly longer than the 9.3x62mm, allowing for lower pressure in the case while retaining muzzle velocity and energy.

Ammunition
The 9.3×62mm was first loaded with an  bullet at a muzzle velocity of 655 m/s (2,150 ft/s). After World War I some companies increased the velocity to around 730 m/s (2,400 ft/s), and brought out lighter bullets. Rifles set up for the original load have their sights readjusted to shoot the newer load to point of aim. Adding to the confusion, loads at both velocities are still available. Several European firms load 9.3×62mm ammunition, including Lapua, Norma, RUAG Ammotec (RWS), SAKO, and Prvi Partizan (PPU) as well as Denel (PMP) of South Africa, and it is widely available in Africa.

In England, Kynoch, the well-known cartridge manufacturer, produced ammunition, referring to the 9.3×62mm as "9.3mm Mauser". Typically it was loaded as "
metal covered soft nose bullet",  with the base marked simplyKynoch 9.3 mm. This is no longer listed by them.

Elsewhere

In several European countries, the 9.3×62mm remains a popular cartridge for hunting game like moose and wild boar, and it is offered as a standard chambering in rifles from most makers there. The CZ-USA CZ 550 rifle in 9.3×62mm chambering became available in North America in 2002, and both rifle and cartridge are gaining a strong following there, as the cartridge has a slight power edge over the popular .35 Whelen cartridge. In the US, several ammunition makers including Federal, Hornady, Nosler, and Swift offer factory-loaded 9.3×62mm sporting ammunition. Since surplus Scandinavian and European Mausers were brought to Canada in 9.3 calibre in the early 1950s, Canadian hunters have used the 9.3×62mm cartridge to hunt large game including bison, all the deer species, and large bears. In recent years, CZ of Czech Republic, as well as SAKO and Tikka of Finland have imported many 9.3×62mm rifles to Canada and US where demand continues to be high.

Adequacy
The 9.3×62mm is considered ideal for hunting the larger and tougher African game species, such as lions, leopards, gemsboks, elands, and wildebeests. Most hunters consider it a viable all-around cartridge comparable to .338 Winchester Magnum, 9.3×64mm Brenneke, and .375 H&H Magnum. The 9.3×62mm has taken cleanly every dangerous game species in Africa.  Though it is of smaller bore than the legal minimum .375 calibre for dangerous game in most countries, many countries specifically make an exception for the 9.3×62mm. The 9.3×62mm is considered adequate for European and North American game animals that may become dangerous, such as feral hogs and bears. 

Sambar hunters in Australia are turning to the 9.3×62mm due to Federal Government's 1996 ban on self-loading rifles.  Thousands of deer hunters at once needed bolt-action rifles which delivered one-shot knockdown power on Sambar, and the 9.3×62mm calibre has proven to be well up to that task.

Apart from hunting class 3 game, the 9.3×62mm is often used for last resort defense against dangerous class 3 game, particularly the great bears including brown and polar bears. It is often carried by fishermen, hunters and guides in European arctic regions like Greenland for protection as encounters with these larger bear species can be common.

See also
 9.3×74mmR
 9.3×64mm Brenneke
 .338 Winchester Magnum
 .35 Whelen
 .350 Remington Magnum
 .358 Norma Magnum
 .358 Winchester
 .375 H&H Magnum
 9 mm caliber
 List of rifle cartridges
 Table of handgun and rifle cartridges

References

External links
 A Most Marvelous Metric - The 9.3mm holds the light heavyweight crown among European bore sizes and should be more popular stateside than it is - by Craig Boddington
Jagen Weltweit, Die Patrone 9,3x62 by Norbert Klups (German)
 9.3x62 - Otto Bock's Cartridge http://www.africanxmag.com/otto_bock%27s_cartridge.htm

Pistol and rifle cartridges